The Classic is a 2001 Finnish comedy film directed by Kari Väänänen. It is based on Kari Hotakainen's semi-autobiographical novel Klassikko. The film stars Martti Suosalo as writer Kari Hotakainen who receives an assignment from his publisher to write a confessional autobiographical novel.

Pertti Sveholm won the best supporting actor Jussi Award for his role as police lieutenant Vikström.

Cast 
 Martti Suosalo as Kari Hotakainen, a writer
 Janne Hyytiäinen as Pertti Olavi "Pera" Kiilopää
 Matti Onnismaa as Kartio, a car dealer
 Pertti Sveholm as Vikström, a police lieutenant
 Pirkka-Pekka Petelius as Veisterä, a publisher
 Arvi Lind as himself
 Susanna Roine as Tiia

References

External links 
 
 

2001 comedy films
2001 films
Films about writers
Films based on Finnish novels
Films set in Finland
Films shot in Finland
Finnish comedy films
2000s Finnish-language films